Louis Hardiquest (15 December 1910 – 20 January 1991) was a Belgian cyclist. He finished in 8th place in the 1934 Paris–Roubaix and in 2nd place in the 1938 Paris–Roubaix.

References

1910 births
1991 deaths
Belgian male cyclists
Cyclists from Flemish Brabant
People from Hoegaarden